Padang is an ethnic group in Sudan, a subgroup of the Dinka. They speak Padang, a Dinka language. Many members of this ethnicity are Christians. The population of this ethnicity exceeds 100,000.

References

Ethnic groups in Sudan
Dinka people